Gina Fulton Carter (born 13 February 1971) is a British former competitive figure skater in ladies' singles. She is the 1990 Piruetten silver medalist, a three-time British national medalist, and competed at the 1988 Winter Olympics in Calgary. Her best result at an ISU Championship was 12th at the 1987 European Championships in Sarajevo.

Results

References

English female single skaters
British female single skaters
1971 births
Olympic figure skaters of Great Britain
Figure skaters at the 1988 Winter Olympics
Living people
Sportspeople from Durham, England